James Loembe (born March 25, 2001 in Lomé) is a Togo international footballer.

Career
Loembe began his career with Academy Delta and joined in summer 2007 to AS Douanes. He has turned down offers from top notch teams in Ghana like Accra Hearts of Oak, Tema Youth and league debutantes Bechem Chelsea, saying he is attracted to Kumasi Asante Kotoko because of their youth team, prospects in the CAF Champions League. On 5 November 2008, he featured for Kumasi Asante Kotoko in a trial match against King Faisal Babes in Memory of the late Honour Kwadwo Baah-Wiredu at the Baba Yara Stadium which Kotoko lost by a lone goal to a King Faisal side that had the entire 1st team squad except Goalkeeper Osei Boateng and Ebo 'Nani' Andoh of Black Starlets fame. He played excellently at the heart of the defence throughout the entire 90 minutes of the game which impressed the Technical handlers of Kotoko led by Coach Bashiru Hayford.

International career
Loembe made his national debut for the Young Hawks of Togo in the AFCON U-17 TOGO 2007 on 10 March 2007 at the Stade de Kege in Lomé and played for the entire 90 minutes of the game against South Africa which the Young Hawks won 2-0. He could have captained the squad but for his lack of fluency in French, the team's communication language; he speaks fluently in English, Twi, Ga, Hausa and a little French. Loembe marshalled the defence like the captain of the team throughout the entire tournament and together with his teammates went on to the final, but lost 0-1 to Nigeria, a pre-tournament favourite and eventual winners of FIFA U-17 World Cup KOREA 2007.

On 24 August 2007, Loembe starred for the Young Hawks of Togo in their maiden 2007 FIFA U-17 World Cup tournament in South Korea against Costa Rica and played the entire group matches against Peru and Korea. He played 90 minutes in all these matches.

He was called into the Local Hawks of Togo CHAN team (The African Nations Championships is a new tournament designed by CAF for only home-based players of its member countries) that faced Ghana in Accra on 4 and 13 May 2008.

He made his debut for the senior national team on 10 August 2011 in a friendly match against Niger, and was included in the squad for the next match, a 2012 Africa Cup of Nations qualifier against Botswana.

Record at FIFA tournaments

FIFA U-17 World Cup

References

External links
 

1991 births
Living people
Sportspeople from Lomé
Togolese footballers
Togo international footballers
AS Douanes (Togo) players
Association football defenders
21st-century Togolese people